Claude Vernon Spratley (July 16, 1882 – October 25, 1976) was born in Surry County, Virginia.  He attended the College of William and Mary, where he received a Bachelor of Arts degree in 1901 and the University of Virginia School of Law, receiving his law degree in 1906.  Afterward, he was admitted to the bar and began practice in Hampton, Virginia.  From 1912 to 1923 he was city attorney for Hampton and town attorney for Phoebus, Virginia, from 1910 to 1923.  In 1923, he was elected judge of the Eleventh Judicial Circuit and served there until being elected to the Supreme Court of Appeals in 1936.  Justice Spratley remained on this court until he retired on September 30, 1967.  Justice Spratley was a member of Phi Beta Kappa and Phi Delta Phi.

1882 births
1976 deaths
Justices of the Supreme Court of Virginia
Virginia lawyers
University of Virginia School of Law alumni
College of William & Mary alumni
People from Elizabeth City County, Virginia
People from Surry County, Virginia
20th-century American judges
Virginia circuit court judges